Ptomaphagini is a tribe of small carrion beetles in the family Leiodidae. There are about 14 genera and more than 110 described species in Ptomaphagini.

Genera
These 14 genera belong to the tribe Ptomaphagini:

 Acrotrychiopsis Normand, 1946
 Adelopsis Portevin, 1907
 Adelopspeleon Salgado, 2012
 Amplexella Gnaspini, 1996
 Baryodirus Perreau, 2000
 Excelsiorella Salgado, 2008
 Pandania Szymczakowski, 1964
 Parapaulipalpina Gnaspini, 1996
 Paulipalpina Gnaspini & Peck, 1996
 Peckena Gnaspini, 1996
 Proptomaphaginus Szymczakowski, 1969
 Ptomaphaginus Portevin, 1914
 Ptomaphagus Hellwig, 1795
 Ptomaphaminus Perreau, 2000

References

Further reading

External links

 

Leiodidae